The East Pakistan Muslim Students League was founded in 1948 following the independence of Pakistan to support the political activities and campaigns of the Muslim League in electoral politics. Sheikh Mujibur Rahman also led the league.

References 

History of East Pakistan
Student organisations in Pakistan
1948 establishments in East Pakistan